The following highways are numbered 222:

Canada
 Manitoba Provincial Road 222
 Newfoundland and Labrador Route 222
 Prince Edward Island Route 222
 Quebec Route 222

China
 China National Highway 222

Costa Rica
 National Route 222

Hungary
 Main road 222 (Hungary)

India
 National Highway 222 (India)

Japan
 Japan National Route 222

Thailand
 Thailand Route 222

United States
 Interstate 222 (future)
 U.S. Route 222
 Arkansas Highway 222
 California State Route 222
 Connecticut Route 222
 Florida State Road 222
 Georgia State Route 222 (former)
 K-222 (Kansas highway) (former)
 Kentucky Route 222
 Maine State Route 222
 Maryland Route 222
 M-222 (Michigan highway)
 Minnesota State Highway 222
 Montana Secondary Highway 222
 New York State Route 222
 North Carolina Highway 222
 Ohio State Route 222
 Oregon Route 222
 Pennsylvania Route 222
 Tennessee State Route 222
 Texas State Highway 222
 Utah State Route 222
 Virginia State Route 222
 Wyoming Highway 222